Tony Ah-Thit Payne (Thai: โทนี่ อาทิตย์ เพย์น; born 13 January 1989) is a Thai long distance runner.  Payne has a marathon personal best of 2:16:56 set at the 2018 Frankfurt Marathon which is the men's Thailand marathon national record and South East Asia record.

Payne competed in the men's marathon at the 2019 World Athletics Championships held in Doha, Qatar. He did not finish his race.

In 2018, Payne finished in eighth position in the men's marathon at the 2018 Asian Games held in Jakarta, Indonesia.

References

Tony Payne
1989 births
Living people
Athletes from Dunedin
Tony Payne
Tony Payne
Tony Payne
Tony Payne
Southeast Asian Games medalists in athletics
Competitors at the 2021 Southeast Asian Games